I de gode, gamle dage is a 1940 Danish film directed by Johan Jacobsen and starring Christian Arhoff.

Cast
In alphabetical order
 Christian Arhoff
 Carl Fischer
 Elith Foss
 Helga Frier
 Harald Holst
 Gunnar Lemvigh
 Harald Madsen as Bivognen
 Johannes Meyer
 Peter Nielsen
 Clara Østø
 Aage Redal
 Poul Reichhardt
 Eigil Reimers
 Carl Schenstrøm as Fyrtaarnet
 Christian Schrøder
 Ole Skaarup as Gunner
 Lise Thomsen as Jytte

External links

1940 films
1940s buddy comedy films
1940s Danish-language films
Danish black-and-white films
Films directed by Johan Jacobsen